D-Erythrulose (also known as erythrulose) is a tetrose carbohydrate with the chemical formula C4H8O4. It has one ketone group and so is part of the ketose family. It is used in some self-tanning cosmetics, in general, combined with dihydroxyacetone (DHA).

Erythrulose/DHA reacts with the amino acids in the proteins of the first layers of skin (the stratum corneum and epidermis). One of the pathways involves free radicals at one of the steps of the Maillard reaction, distantly related to the browning effect when a cut apple slice is exposed to oxygen. The other pathway is the conventional Maillard reaction; both pathways are involved in the browning during food preparation and storage. This is not a stain or dye, but rather a chemical reaction that produces a color change on all treated skin. It does not involve the underlying skin pigmentation nor does it require exposure to ultraviolet light to initiate the color change. However, the 'tan' produced by erythrulose/DHA only has an SPF of up to 3, and enhances the free radical injury from UV (compared to untreated skin) for the 24 hours after self-tanner is applied, according to a 2007 study led by Katinka Jung of the Gematria Test Lab in Berlin. Forty minutes after the researchers treated skin samples with high levels of erythrulose, they found that more than 140 percent additional free radicals formed during sun exposure compared with untreated skin.

DHA produced similar results, but faster; however erythrulose takes longer to develop its full effect, therefore it lasts longer. For a day after self-tanner application, excessive sun exposure should be avoided and sunscreen should be worn outdoors, they say; an antioxidant cream could also minimize free radical production. Although some self-tanners contain sunscreen, its effect will not last as long as the tan. During UV irradiation free radicals, mainly superoxide/hydroperoxyl (O2•−/HO2•), and other reactive species (ROS/RNS) are produced, that can react with the ketoamines (Amadori products) and other intermediates of the Maillard reaction. This leads to autoxidationradical chain reactions of the ketoamines, which cause a dramatic increase in the radical injury of the skin. This can be suppressed by antioxidants, which shows involvement of reactive oxygen species (ROS). The ketoamines were shown to cause DNA strand breaks and to act as mutagens.

The free radicals are due to the action of UV light on AGE (advanced glycation end-products) as a result of the reaction of DHA with the skin, and the intermediates, such as Amadori products (a type of AGE), that lead to them. AGEs absorb UV light, but do not have melanin's extended electronic structure that dissipates the energy, so part of it goes towards starting free radical chain reactions instead, in which other AGEs participate readily. AGEs are behind the damage to the skin that occurs with high blood sugar in diabetes where similar glycation occurs.

Erythrulose is a clear to pale-yellowish liquid, which naturally occurs in red raspberries. According to one method, it is made through aerobic fermentation by the bacterium Gluconobacter, followed by extensive multi-step purification.

Erythrulose and dihydroxyacetone (DHA) are very similar in composition, and both react much the same way on the skin surface. Erythrulose produces a lighter and slower-developing tan, taking 24 to 48 hours to complete development. When used alone, it fades faster than a DHA-based sunless tan. Some people feel the final tone of erythrulose is slightly redder, and less bronze, than the DHA-based tan. It may be less drying to the skin surface, helping provide a smoother fading tint. When combined with DHA, the resulting sunless tan is said to last longer, fade better, and provide a more cosmetically pleasing color tone. In sunless tanning products, it is incorporated at 1% to 3% levels.

Because the skin continually exfoliates itself, losing thousands of dead surface skin cells each day, the tan hue is temporary. The tan appearance lasts from two to 10 days, depending on application type and skin condition.

Not all users develop a tan coloration from erythrulose; some may find their fading is more uneven and blotchy when this ingredient is used. Because of the added cost associated with this ingredient, some manufacturers feel it is an inefficient additive to the sunless tanning product line.

Individuals sensitive to DHA may be able to use erythrulose as a skin-safe self-tanning replacement. Erythrulose is more expensive, and difficult to obtain.

Erythrulose is not currently approved by the Food and Drug Administration (FDA) as a self-tanning agent.

References

Cosmetics chemicals
Ketotetroses